The 2016 Mitas Czech Republic FIM Speedway Grand Prix was the fourth race of the 2016 Speedway Grand Prix season. It took place on June 25 at the Markéta Stadium in Prague, Czech Republic.

Riders 
For the fourth successive Grand Prix first reserve Fredrik Lindgren replaced Jarosław Hampel, who had injured himself during the 2015 Speedway World Cup and was not fit to compete. The Speedway Grand Prix Commission also nominated Václav Milík Jr. as the wild card, and Josef Franc and Eduard Krčmář both as Track Reserves.

Results 
The Grand Prix was won by Jason Doyle, who beat Greg Hancock, Chris Harris and Niels Kristian Iversen in the final. It was the first time the Australian had won a Grand Prix. Hancock top stored overall during the meeting and, with former joint-leaders Tai Woffinden and Chris Holder both failing to make the final, he took the lead in the Championship standings.

Heat details

The intermediate classification

References

See also 
 motorcycle speedway

Czech Republic
Speedway Grand Prix
Speedway Grand Prix of Czech Republic